Typhoon Wutip, known in the Philippines as Tropical Depression Betty, was the most powerful February typhoon on record, surpassing Typhoon Higos of 2015. The third tropical cyclone, second tropical storm, and the first typhoon of the 2019 Pacific typhoon season, Wutip originated from a low-pressure area on February 16, 2019. The disturbance moved westward, passing just south of the Federated States of Micronesia (FSM), before later organizing into a tropical depression, giving it the numeral identifier 02W on February 18, which would intensify into a tropical storm and be named Wutip on February 20, before strengthening further into a typhoon the following day.

Wutip underwent an eyewall replacement cycle shortly afterward, causing the storm to weaken as it turned northwest. Wutip finished its eyewall replacement cycle on February 24, which allowed Wutip to restrengthen, with the typhoon rapidly intensifying once again. Afterward, Wutip weakened on February 26, due to encountering strong wind shear as it moved northwestward, before dissipating on March 2.

Prior to the storm's arrival, advisories were issued across Micronesia and the Northern Mariana Islands by the National Weather Service office in Tiyan, Guam. Power outages occurred across Guam. About 160 houses were damaged and 165 people were homeless in Yap and Chuuk. A disaster declaration from Guam governor Lou Leon Guerrero and another from president of the Federated States of Micronesia Peter M. Christian were approved by Donald Trump a few months after the storm. Wutip caused at least $3.3 million (2019 USD) in damages in Guam and Micronesia.

Meteorological history

On February 16, 2019, a low-pressure area formed to the south of Marshall Islands, gradually organizing as it moved westward, passing just south of the Federated States of Micronesia. The system organized into a tropical depression on February 18, and the Joint Typhoon Warning Center (JTWC) gave the storm the identifier 02W. Tropical Depression 02W strengthened with a more organized center of circulation into a tropical storm and received the name Wutip from the Japan Meteorological Agency (JMA) on February 20.

This also allowed Wutip to surpass Typhoon Higos from 2015 as the strongest February typhoon on record, the only Category 5 super typhoon recorded in the month of February, and the only Category 5-equivalent storm recorded in February in the Northern Hemisphere. Wutip underwent an eyewall replacement cycle, weakening back to Category 3-equivalent typhoon intensity as it turned to the north-northwest. On February 24, Wutip finished its eyewall replacement cycle with a well-defined and annular eye and quickly re-intensified, resuming a trend of rapid intensification.

Early on February 26, Wutip encountered wind shear, weakening the storm once again. Wutip's once-visible  eye became cloud-filled as the storm weakened. By this time, the storm's eye could no longer be detected on satellite imagery. Wutip made a turn to the west-northwest while rapidly weakening, due to hostile conditions. On the following day, Wutip weakened into a tropical depression and on the same day, was given the name Betty by the PAGASA, as the storm entered the Philippine Area of Responsibility (PAR) in the Philippine Sea. Wutip made a clockwise loop to the west on March 1, 2019, before dissipating the next day.

Preparations and impact

Guam 

A team of 18 from the Federal Emergency Management Agency (FEMA) assisted Guam with emergencies on February 22.

Wutip caused power outages across the island when it passed through the area on February 23. Wutip's closest approach was on February 24, when the storm passed  to the southwest of Guam. The worst conditions from Wutip persisted through Saturday night, on February 23, and the storm also produced hazardous seas during that time. Preliminary damage in infrastructure for Wutip totaled $1.3 million.

Federated States of Micronesia 
Tropical storm watches and warnings were issued for Chuuk State, Pohnpei, and Yap State in Federated States of Micronesia by the National Weather Service office in Tiyan, Guam as Tropical Depression 02W was approaching the FSM on February 19, 2019; however, the tropical storm warning for Faraulep in Yap State was later cancelled. The advisories were later upgraded to typhoon watches and warnings after Tropical Depression 02W intensified into Tropical Storm Wutip on February 20, with forecasts stating that Wutip would later strengthen into a typhoon.

The storm left at least 165 people homeless, leaving approximately 160 houses damaged or destroyed in both Chuuk and Yap. Strong winds and sea water inundation also destroyed food sources in the affected areas and rendered water sources unsafe to drink. In response to the storm's impact, local authorities declared states of emergency for Chuuk and Yap. Wutip caused heavy preliminary damage in agriculture and infrastructure and costed a total of $2 million.

Northern Mariana Islands 
The islands of Agrihan, Pagan, Rota, Saipan, and Tinian were issued a tropical storm watch on February 22. The tropical storm watch in Rota was later upgraded to a typhoon warning, but was canceled on February 25 by Lieutenant Governor Arnold Palacios when Wutip headed in a different direction from the islands, which no longer posed a threat to the islands. As a result, schools were reopened across the Northern Mariana Islands and Guam on February 25. There was only minor flooding upon the islands.

Aftermath 

The Federated States of Micronesia President Peter M. Christian declared a national disaster on March 11, due to the effects of the storm, and requested international assistance. In response, the United States Agency for International Development’s Office of U.S. Foreign Disaster Assistance provided $100,000 to support immediate disaster relief activities, for the affected populations in the FSM. In addition, the USAID/OFDA deployed staff based in the region to the FSM, to help coordinate response activities in collaboration with the Federated States of Micronesia authorities, the U.S. Government inter-agency staff, regional humanitarian actors, and other donors.  U.S. Chargé d'affaires Heather Coble declared a disaster the following day, allowing the USAID, FEMA, and the federal government of the FSM to carry out a Joint Damage Assessment and relieve activities supporting agriculture and food security. A multinational team arrived at Lower Mortlock Islands of Chuuk State to assist local communities as part of Pacific Partnership 2019 on March 31, which included helping the state recover after the storm.

On May 7, U.S. President Donald Trump declared "a disaster under the Compact of Free Association between the Government of the United States of America and the Government of the Federated States of Micronesia, as amended", due to damage resulting from Wutip. Relief and reconstruction funding from the USAID totaled more than $22.3 million. On May 11, 2019, Donald Trump approved the disaster declaration requested by Guam Governor Lou Leon Guerrero on February 23 due to the impact the Mariana Islands had from Wutip. Tracy C. Haynes was appointed by Trump as Federal Coordinating Officer (FCO) for recovery operations across Guam.

See also 

 Weather of 2019
 Tropical cyclones in 2019
 Other systems named Wutip
 Typhoon Keith – A Category 5-equivalent super typhoon that affected the some of the same areas in 1997
 Typhoon Higos – The previous record holder of the strongest typhoon in February on record
 Typhoon Maysak (2015) – The most powerful pre-April typhoon on record; struck Micronesia and the Philippines
 Typhoon Jelawat – An early-season Category 4-equivalent super typhoon from 2018, which affected some of the same areas
 Typhoon Yutu – A powerful Category 5-equivalent super typhoon that devastated Saipan and Tinian in the Northern Mariana Islands during the previous year
 Typhoon Surigae – The most powerful April typhoon on record

References

External links 

02W.WUTIP from the U.S. Naval Research Laboratory
 General Information of Typhoon Wutip (1902) from Digital Typhoon
 JMA Best Track Data of Typhoon Wutip (1902) (in Japanese)
 JMA Best Track (Graphics) of Typhoon Wutip (1902)

W
Wutip
2019 natural disasters
2019 in Guam
2019 in the Northern Mariana Islands
February 2019 events in Oceania
February 2019 events in Asia
Wutip
Wutip